Sanjay Yadav is an Indian politician and a member of 17th Legislative Assembly of Uttar Pradesh of India. He represents the Sikanderpur constituency of Ballia district Uttar Pradesh and is a member of the Bhartiya Janata Party.

Early life and education
Yadav was born 5 September 1979 in Kasili, Deoria, Uttar Pradesh to his father Harinath Yadav. He married Anamika Yadav, they have one son. He belongs to Backward Class (Ahir) community. He graduated from Mahatma Gandhi University, Meghalaya in 2015.

Political career
Yadav has been MLA for one term. Since 2017, he represents Sikanderpur (Assembly constituency) as a member of Bhartiya Janata Party. He defeated Samajwadi Party candidate Ziauddin Rizwi by a margin of 23,548 votes.

Posts held

References 

Bharatiya Janata Party politicians from Uttar Pradesh
People from Ballia district
Living people
Uttar Pradesh MLAs 2017–2022
1979 births